Victoriano Leguizamón Cristaldo (23 March 1922 – 7 April 2007) was a football midfielder and coach from Paraguay.

Career
Leguizamón started his career in his hometown Concepción before arriving in Asunción at the age of 18 to play for C.A. River Plate. In 1945 he signed for Libertad and in the next year he went to Argentina to play for Quilmes A.C. and then for Boca Juniors. In 1950 he came back to Paraguay to play for Olimpia Asunción until 1956.

Leguizamón was part of the Paraguay national football team that participated in the 1950 FIFA World Cup and the 1953 Copa America which was eventually won by Paraguay. He has 19 caps and no goals playing for Paraguay.

As a coach, he managed several teams from his native city Concepción.

References

External links

1922 births
Paraguayan footballers
Club Libertad footballers
Quilmes Atlético Club footballers
Boca Juniors footballers
Club Olimpia footballers
Paraguay international footballers
1950 FIFA World Cup players
Paraguayan expatriate footballers
Expatriate footballers in Argentina
2007 deaths
Association football midfielders